Phonetic sciences may refer to:

 Phonetics, the study of the sounds of human speech
 Phonology, the study of the sound system of a specific language (or languages)